The Federal War — also known as the Great War or the Five Year War — was a civil war (1859–1863) in Venezuela between the Conservative party and the Liberal party over the monopoly the Conservatives held over government positions and land ownership, and their intransigence to granting any reforms. This drove the Liberals – known as the Federalists – to look for greater autonomy for the provinces: a new federalism for Venezuela, as it were. It was the biggest and bloodiest civil war that Venezuela had since its independence from Spain on 5 July 1811. Hundreds of thousands died in the violence of the war, or from hunger or disease, in a country with a population of just over a million people.

The conflict emerged as a struggle for power between the conservative government of President José Tadeo Monagas and the liberal opposition led by Ezequiel Zamora. The liberals initially gained the upper hand, winning several battles, but their momentum was eventually slowed by the intervention of European powers.

Struggles in the government and society
Venezuela was facing many social and governmental struggles during this time period. Many factors contributed to the start of the war within the country, including social problems inherited from the struggle for independence, tensions among the diverse economic and political groups, a succession of armed movements in rural areas, and the hopes for a change in the government structure which was a centralist-federalist government.

Start of the war 
On February 20, 1859, in the city of Coro (Falcon state), northern Venezuela federalist proclaimed the creation of a federation, the abolition of the death penalty, universal suffrage and political pluralism. As a result, fighting broke out in various parts of the country, starting the Federal War in Venezuela.

Important people 
Ezequiel Zamora was the federalist who won the battle of Santa Ines in 1859 giving the feds a taste of victory. Zamora was a venezuelan soldier and leader of the federalists in the Federal War. Thanks to his friend who was a lawyer, Zamora learned a lot about philosophy and the foundations of Roman law, and soon advocated the "principles of equality" and the need for Venezuela to have this implemented. He was named the Federalist's "Chief Operating Officer of the West" after the battles he won there.

León de Febres Cordero y Oberto was an army and political conservative from Venezuela who was a key leader in the war for independence of the country. He was also a key person in the Federal War, he won many battles for the conservatives including the battle of Coplé. Leon lost the battle of Santa Inés, he retrieved to save his troops, later on he gathered strenght and in Caracas, Febres Cordero defeated the federalists and celebrated the victory in the battle of Coplé.

Course of the war 
The Federal war was characterized by the guerrillas that were provoked in the intertior of the country, this is why the battle had only two major battles, the battle of Santa Inés, and the battle of the Coplé.

 Battle of Santa Inés took place on December 10, 1859, and won the feds under the command of Ezequiel Zamora. 
The conservative government with the leadership of Pedro Estanislao Ramos had 12,000 soldiers at his disposal while the Federalists with the leadership of Ezequiel Zamora had 20,000 soldiers on his disposal. The war was fought on land with General Ramos being seriously injured, many of his soldiers, horses, and artillery died in the battle. He withdrew from the battle and ran, only 2,000 troops came with him the others passed away. On the other side, the federalists with the leadership of Zamora were left with 6,000 soldiers after the devastating battle. In total, around 24,000 people died in the event.
 A month later, on February 17, 1860, the battle of Coplé took place. The conservative side in charge of the lion of Febres Cordero was victorious.
In the battle of Cople, Juan Crisostomo Falcon was the leader of the federalists while Leon de Febres Cordero y Oberto was the leader of the Conservatives. The federalists army had 24,400 troops while on the other hand, the conservatives army had between 14,380 - 15000 troops. After the battle, the federalists had lost 5,000 men, and the casualties from the conservatives is unknown.

It is estimated that the total number of casualties almost reaches 100,000.

End of the war 
The Federal War in Venezuela went on for four years until April 1863 due to the signing of the treaty of Coche that put an end to it.
Many changes came with the end of the war:
 Abolition of the death penalty.
 Establishment of the Federation, with the entry into force of the constitution of 1864.
 Shortage of the agricultural activity in the plains due to the fires.
 Decrease in foreign trade.
 Reduction of the central government army.

References

 Bednar, R. (2017c, April 25). 10 Characteristics of the Federal War in Venezuela. Life Persona. https://www.lifepersona.com/10-characteristics-of-the-federal-war-in-venezuela

 Encyclopedia.com. https://www.encyclopedia.com/humanities/encyclopedias-almanacs-transcripts-and-maps/federal-war-venezuela-1859-1863

External links 

 Great War: Virtual Gallery

 
History of Venezuela
Wars involving Venezuela
Civil wars involving the states and peoples of South America
Civil wars of the Industrial era
1859 in Venezuela
1860 in Venezuela
1861 in Venezuela
1862 in Venezuela
1863 in Venezuela
Conservatism in Venezuela